Mary Jane Oliver (September 10, 1935 – January 17, 2019) was an American poet who won the National Book Award and the Pulitzer Prize. Her work is inspired by nature, rather than the human world, stemming from her lifelong passion for solitary walks in the wild. It is characterised by a sincere wonderment at the impact of natural imagery, conveyed in unadorned language. In 2007, she was declared to be the country's best-selling poet.

Early life
Mary Oliver was born to Edward William and Helen M. (Vlasak) Oliver on September 10, 1935, in Maple Heights, Ohio, a semi-rural suburb of Cleveland. Her father was a social studies teacher and an athletics coach in the Cleveland public schools. As a child, she spent a great deal of time outside where she enjoyed going on walks or reading. In an interview with the Christian Science Monitor in 1992, Oliver commented on growing up in Ohio, saying "It was pastoral, it was nice, it was an extended family. I don't know why I felt such an affinity with the natural world except that it was available to me, that's the first thing. It was right there. And for whatever reasons, I felt those first important connections, those first experiences being made with the natural world rather than with the social world." In 2011, in an interview with Maria Shriver, Oliver described her family as dysfunctional, adding that though her childhood was very hard, writing helped her create her own world. Oliver revealed in the interview with Shriver that she had been sexually abused as a child and had experienced recurring nightmares.

Oliver began writing poetry at the age of 14. She graduated from the local high school in Maple Heights. In the summer of 1951 at the age of 15 she attended the National Music Camp at Interlochen, Michigan, now known as Interlochen Arts Camp, where she was in the percussion section of the National High School Orchestra. At 17 she visited the home of the late Pulitzer Prize-winning poet Edna St. Vincent Millay, in Austerlitz, New York, where she then formed a friendship with the late poet's sister Norma. Oliver and Norma spent the next six to seven years at the estate organizing Edna St. Vincent Millay's papers.

Oliver studied at The Ohio State University and Vassar College in the mid-1950s, but did not receive a degree at either college.

Career

She worked at ''Steepletop'', the estate of Edna St. Vincent Millay, as secretary to the poet's sister. Oliver's first collection of poems, No Voyage and Other Poems, was published in 1963, when she was 28. During the early 1980s, Oliver taught at Case Western Reserve University. Her fifth collection of poetry, American Primitive, won the Pulitzer Prize for Poetry in 1984. She was Poet In Residence at Bucknell University (1986) and Margaret Banister Writer in Residence at Sweet Briar College (1991), then moved to Bennington, Vermont, where she held the Catharine Osgood Foster Chair for Distinguished Teaching at Bennington College until 2001.

She won the Christopher Award and the L. L. Winship/PEN New England Award for her piece House of Light (1990), and New and Selected Poems (1992) won the National Book Award. Oliver's work turns towards nature for its inspiration and describes the sense of wonder it instilled in her. "When it's over," she says, "I want to say: all my life / I was a bride married to amazement. I was the bridegroom, taking the world into my arms." ("When Death Comes" from New and Selected Poems (1992)) Her collections Winter Hours: Prose, Prose Poems, and Poems (1999), Why I Wake Early (2004), and New and Selected Poems, Volume 2 (2004) build the themes. The first and second parts of Leaf and the Cloud are featured in The Best American Poetry 1999 and 2000, and her essays appear in Best American Essays 1996, 1998 and 2001. Oliver was the editor of the 2009 edition of Best American Essays.

Poetic identity 
Mary Oliver's poetry is grounded in memories of Ohio and her adopted home of New England, setting most of her poetry in and around Provincetown after she moved there in the 1960s.  Influenced by both Whitman and Thoreau, she is known for her clear and poignant observances of the natural world. In fact, according to the 1983 Chronology of American Literature, the "American Primitive," one of Oliver's collection of poems, "...presents a new kind of Romanticism that refuses to acknowledge boundaries between nature and the observing self." Her creativity was stirred by nature, and Oliver, an avid walker, often pursued inspiration on foot. Her poems are filled with imagery from her daily walks near her home: shore birds, water snakes, the phases of the moon and humpback whales. In Long life she says  "[I] go off to my woods, my ponds, my sun-filled harbor, no more than a blue comma on the map of the world but, to me, the emblem of everything." She commented in a rare interview "When things are going well, you know, the walk does not get rapid or get anywhere: I finally just stop, and write. That's a successful walk!" She said that she once found herself walking in the woods with no pen and later hid pencils in the trees so she would never be stuck in that place again.  She often carried a 3-by-5-inch hand-sewn notebook for recording impressions and phrases. Maxine Kumin called Oliver "a patroller of wetlands in the same way that Thoreau was an inspector of snowstorms." Oliver stated that her favorite poets were Walt Whitman, Rumi, Hafez, Ralph Waldo Emerson, Percy Bysshe Shelley and John Keats.

Oliver has also been compared to Emily Dickinson, with whom she shared an affinity for solitude and inner monologues.  Her poetry combines dark introspection with joyous release.  Although she was criticized for writing poetry that assumes a close relationship between women and nature, she found that the self is only strengthened through an immersion with nature. Oliver is also known for her unadorned language and accessible themes. The Harvard Review describes her work as an antidote to "inattention and the baroque conventions of our social and professional lives. She is a poet of wisdom and generosity whose vision allows us to look intimately at a world not of our making."

In 2007 The New York Times described her as "far and away, this country's best-selling poet."

Personal life
On a visit to Austerlitz in the late 1950s, Oliver met photographer Molly Malone Cook, who would become her partner for over forty years. In Our World, a book of Cook's photos and journal excerpts Oliver compiled after Cook's death, Oliver writes, "I took one look [at Cook] and fell, hook and tumble." Cook was Oliver's literary agent. They made their home largely in Provincetown, Massachusetts, where they lived until Cook's death in 2005, and where Oliver continued to live until relocating to Florida. Of Provincetown she recalled, "I too fell in love with the town, that marvelous convergence of land and water; Mediterranean light; fishermen who made their living by hard and difficult work from frighteningly small boats; and, both residents and sometime visitors, the many artists and writers.[...] M. and I decided to stay."

Oliver valued her privacy and gave very few interviews, saying she preferred for her writing to speak for itself.

Death 
In 2012, Oliver was diagnosed with lung cancer, but was treated and given a "clean bill of health." Oliver died of lymphoma on January 17, 2019, at the age of 83.

Critical reviews 
Maxine Kumin describes Mary Oliver in the Women's Review of Books as an "indefatigable guide to the natural world, particularly to its lesser-known aspects." Reviewing Dream Work for The Nation, critic Alicia Ostriker numbered Oliver among America's finest poets: "visionary as Emerson [... she is] among the few American poets who can describe and transmit ecstasy, while retaining a practical awareness of the world as one of predators and prey." New York Times reviewer Bruce Bennetin stated that the Pulitzer Prize–winning collection American Primitive, "insists on the primacy of the physical" while Holly Prado of Los Angeles Times Book Review noted that it "touches a vitality in the familiar that invests it with a fresh intensity."

Vicki Graham suggests Oliver over-simplifies the affiliation of gender and nature: "Oliver's celebration of dissolution into the natural world troubles some critics: her poems flirt dangerously with romantic assumptions about the close association of women with nature that many theorists claim put the woman writer at risk."  In her article "The Language of Nature in the Poetry of Mary Oliver", Diane S. Bond echoes that "few feminists have wholeheartedly appreciated Oliver's work, and though some critics have read her poems as revolutionary reconstructions of the female subject, others remain skeptical that identification with nature can empower women." In The Harvard Gay & Lesbian Review, Sue Russell notes that "Mary Oliver will never be a balladeer of contemporary lesbian life in the vein of Marilyn Hacker, or an important political thinker like Adrienne Rich; but the fact that she chooses not to write from a similar political or narrative stance makes her all the more valuable to our collective culture."

Selected awards and honors 

1969/70 Shelley Memorial Award from the Poetry Society of America.
 1980 Guggenheim Foundation Fellowship
 1984 Pulitzer Prize for Poetry for American Primitive
 1991 L.L. Winship/PEN New England Award for House of Light
 1992 National Book Award for Poetry for New and Selected Poems
 1998 Lannan Literary Award for poetry
 1998 Honorary Doctorate from The Art Institute of Boston
 2003 Honorary membership into Phi Beta Kappa from Harvard University.
 2007 Honorary Doctorate Dartmouth College
 2008 Honorary Doctorate Tufts University
 2012 Honorary Doctorate from Marquette University
 2012 Goodreads Choice Award for Best Poetry for A Thousand Mornings

Works

Poetry collections
1963 No Voyage, and Other Poems Dent (New York, NY), expanded edition, Houghton Mifflin (Boston, MA), 1965.
1972 The River Styx, Ohio, and Other Poems Harcourt (New York, NY) 
1978 The Night Traveler Bits Press
1978 Sleeping in the Forest Ohio University (a 12-page chapbook, p. 49–60 in The Ohio Review—Vol. 19, No. 1 [Winter 1978])
1979 Twelve Moons Little, Brown (Boston, MA), 
1983 American Primitive Little, Brown (Boston, MA) 
1986  Dream Work Atlantic Monthly Press (Boston, MA) 
1987 Provincetown Appletree Alley, limited edition with woodcuts by Barnard Taylor
1990 House of Light Beacon Press (Boston, MA) 
1992 New and Selected Poems [volume one] Beacon Press (Boston, MA), 
1994 White Pine: Poems and Prose Poems Harcourt (San Diego, CA) 
1995 Blue Pastures Harcourt (New York, NY) 
1997 West Wind: Poems and Prose Poems Houghton Mifflin (Boston, MA) 
1999 Winter Hours: Prose, Prose Poems, and Poems Houghton Mifflin (Boston, MA) 
2000 The Leaf and the Cloud Da Capo (Cambridge, Massachusetts), (prose poem) 
2002 What Do We Know Da Capo (Cambridge, Massachusetts) 
2003 Owls and Other Fantasies: poems and essays Beacon (Boston, MA) 
2004 Why I Wake Early: New Poems  Beacon (Boston, MA) 
2004 Blue Iris: Poems and Essays Beacon (Boston, MA) 
2004 Wild geese: selected poems, Bloodaxe, 
2005 New and Selected Poems, volume two Beacon (Boston, MA) 
2005 At Blackwater Pond: Mary Oliver Reads Mary Oliver (audio cd)
2006 Thirst: Poems  (Boston, MA) 
2007 Our World with photographs by Molly Malone Cook, Beacon (Boston, MA)
2008 The Truro Bear and Other Adventures: Poems and Essays, Beacon Press, 
2008 Red Bird Beacon (Boston, MA) 
2009 Evidence Beacon (Boston, MA) 
2010 Swan: Poems and Prose Poems (Boston, MA) 
2012 A Thousand Mornings Penguin (New York, NY) 
2013 Dog Songs Penguin Press (New York, NY) 
2014 Blue Horses Penguin Press (New York, NY) 
2015 Felicity Penguin Press (New York, NY) 
2017 Devotions The Selected Poems of Mary Oliver Penguin Press (New York, NY)

Non-fiction books and other collections
1994 A Poetry Handbook Harcourt (San Diego, CA) 
1998  Rules for the Dance: A Handbook for Writing and Reading Metrical Verse Houghton Mifflin (Boston, MA) 
2004 Long Life: Essays and Other Writings Da Capo (Cambridge, Massachusetts) 
2016 Upstream: Selected Essays Penguin (New York, NY)

Works in translation

Catalan
2018 Ocell Roig (translated by Corina Oproae) Bilingual Edition. Godall Edicions.

See also
Poppies, poem by Mary Oliver
In Blackwater Woods, poem by Mary Oliver
 Lesbian Poetry

Notes

References
Bond, Diane. "The Language of Nature in the Poetry of Mary Oliver." Womens Studies 21:1 (1992), p. 1.
Graham, Vicki. "'Into the Body of Another': Mary Oliver and the Poetics of Becoming Other." Papers on Language and Literature, 30:4 (Fall 1994), pp. 352–353, pp. 366–368.
McNew, Janet. "Mary Oliver and the Tradition of Romantic Nature Poetry". Contemporary Literature, 30:1 (Spring 1989).
"Oliver, Mary." American Environmental Leaders: From Colonial Times to the Present, Anne Becher, and Joseph Richey, Grey House Publishing, 2nd edition, 2008. Credo Reference.
Russell, Sue. "Mary Oliver: The Poet and the Persona." The Harvard Gay & Lesbian Review, 4:4 (Fall 1997), pp. 21–22.
"1992." The Chronology of American Literature, edited by Daniel S. Burt, Houghton Mifflin, 1st edition, 2004. Credo Reference.

External links

Official website
Mary Oliver at the Academy of American Poets
Biography and poems of Mary Oliver at the Poetry Foundation.
Interview with Krista Tippett, "On Being" radio program, broadcast 5 February 2015.

1935 births
2019 deaths
American women poets
American lesbian writers
National Book Award winners
Pulitzer Prize for Poetry winners
Ohio State University alumni
Vassar College alumni
American LGBT poets
Poets from Ohio
20th-century American poets
20th-century American women writers
21st-century American poets
21st-century American women writers
People from Cuyahoga County, Ohio
LGBT people from Ohio
Bucknell University faculty
Sweet Briar College faculty
Bennington College faculty
Deaths from lymphoma
Deaths from cancer in Florida
Lesbian academics
American women academics